Christmas Coach Trip was the first and only series of a Christmas-themed version of Coach Trip. Filming for this series took place from 28 November to 12 December 2011 and aired on 12 December 2011. On this 15-day tour, the couples get to vote off the other couples that they do not get along with and on the last day of the coach trip the remaining couples vote for the couple that they want to win. The first day of the coach trip started in Trondheim and the last day of the trip ended in Inari.

Contestants
 Indicates the couple were aboard the coach
 Indicates the couple were immune from votes
 Indicates that the most popular couple received a christmas present with the most votes
 Indicates that the couple were voted as the most popular couple and won series 
 Indicates that the couple were voted as the second most popular couple 
 Indicates that the couple were voted as the third most popular couple
 Indicates that the couple were voted as the fourth most popular couple
 Indicates the couple got a yellow card
 Indicates the couple got a red card

Christmas Voting History

 Indicates that the couple received a yellow card
 Indicates that the couple was red carded off the trip
 Indicates that the most popular couple received a christmas present with the most votes
 Indicates that the couple was immune from any votes cast against them due to it either being their first vote or winning immunity from the vote
 Indicates that the couple were voted as the most popular couple and won series
 Indicates that the couple were voted as the second most popular couple
 Indicates that the couple were voted as the third most popular couple
 Indicates that the couple were voted as the fourth most popular couple

 Due to Diana and Rebecca winning immunity, at vote time the couple who received the most votes would get an immediate red card which resulted in Steven & Jamie receiving the red card.

The trip by day

Arrival Day and Day 1 Trondheim
Location: Trondheim
Morning Activity: Christmas Tree construction & Christmas decorating
Afternoon Activity: Figure skating

Day 2
Location: Hell Itself
Morning Activity: Icelandic pony ride
Afternoon Activity:

Day 3
Location: Åre
Morning Activity: Zip-wiring
Afternoon Activity: Moose meat tasting

Day 4
Location: Ostersund
Morning Activity: Viking activities
Afternoon Activity: Christmas wreath making

Day 5
Location: Sollefteå
Morning Activity: Sauna
Afternoon Activity:

Day 6
Location: Ornskoldsvik
Morning Activity: Canoeing
Afternoon Activity: Ice hockey

Day 7
Location: Umeå
Morning Activity: Culinary delights
Afternoon Activity: Christmas bauble making

Day 8
Location: Skellefteå
Morning Activity: Pantomime training
Afternoon Activity: Curling

Day 9
Location: Luleå
Morning Activity: Abseilling
Afternoon Activity:

Day 10
Location: Lapland Part 1
Morning Activity: White-water rafting
Afternoon Activity:

Day 11
Location: Lapland Part 2
Morning Activity: Elf training
Afternoon Activity:

Day 12
Location: Rovaniemi
Morning Activity: 
Afternoon Activity:

Day 13
Location: The Arctic Circle Part 1
Morning Activity: Frisbee golf
Afternoon Activity: Amethyst mine tour

Day 14
Location: The Arctic Circle Part 2
Morning Activity: Husky racing
Afternoon Activity:

Day 15 and The Last Day
Location: Inari
Morning Activity: Reindeer farm
Afternoon Activity: Felt-making craft lesson

References

2011 British television seasons
Coach Trip series
Television shows set in Finland
Television shows set in Norway
Television shows set in Sweden